The Segerstrom Center for the Arts (originally called Orange County Performing Arts Center) is a performing arts complex in Costa Mesa, California, United States, which opened in 1986. Designed by Charles Lawrence, the Center's Segerstrom Hall and Judy Morr Theater were completed that same year. The Renée and Henry Segerstrom Concert Hall, Samueli Theater, and Lawrence and Kristina Dodge Education Center opened in 2006. They were the work of architect Cesar Pelli, the recipient of numerous awards and professional honors, including the American Institute of Architects Gold Medal in 1995.

The Center is the artistic home to three resident companies: the Pacific Symphony, Philharmonic Society of Orange County, and Pacific Chorale.

Facilities

Venues
Segerstrom Hall, a 2,994-seat, opera house-style theater, is the campus' largest facility and often the venue for Broadway musicals, ballet, and other large productions. Adjacent to Segestrom Hall is the Renée and Henry Segerstrom Concert Hall, a 1,704-seat theater-in-the-round and home to the William J. Gillespie Concert Organ (C.B. Fisk Opus 130), which has 4,322 pipes and 75 stops, including 57 individual voices, four manual keyboards with 61 notes each, and one pedal keyboard with 32 notes.

Housed in the same building as the Renée and Henry Segerstrom Concert Hall is the Samueli Theater, a 375-seat, multi-purpose facility. Named for Henry Samueli, who donated  to the Segerstrom complex. It is suitable for jazz, cabaret, theater, and special events. The Judy Morr Theater, located in the Center for Dance and Innovation, is a 250-seat hall that serves primarily as ballet-company rehearsal space and as the primary studio for the ABT Gillespie School.

In addition, the Education Center includes the Studio Performance Space and Boeing Education Lab. The Segerstrom complex is also home to the American Ballet Theatre William J. Gillespie School, the School of Dance and Music for Children with Disabilities, Leatherby's Café Rouge, George's Café, Plaza Cafe, and two private donor rooms.

Julianne and George Argyros Plaza is a  area with restaurants, a permanent stage, public seating, and picnic areas.

Orange County Museum of Art
The Orange County Museum of Art broke ground on a new primary facility at the Segerstrom Center for the Arts campus on September 20, 2019. The  structure was designed by Morphosis Architects and was topped off on October 6, 2020, with a virtual ceremony held.

The new museum opened on October 8, 2022.

South Coast Repertory
The Tony Award-winning South Coast Repertory is also located on the Segerstrom Center for the Arts campus. It is widely regarded as one of America's foremost producers of new plays.

See also
List of concert halls

References

External links
Segerstrom Center for the Arts website

Music venues in California
Performing arts centers in California
Buildings and structures in Costa Mesa, California
Orange County, California culture
Event venues established in 1986
1986 establishments in California
Tourist attractions in Costa Mesa, California